The Mingtan Dam is a dam that spans the Shuili River about  downstream from the outlet of Sun Moon Lake in central Taiwan with a height of about . It forms Mingtan Reservoir which is the lower reservoir for the Mingtan Pumped Storage Hydro Power Plant.

History
To meet the demand of the ever-increasing peak load in Taiwan and to fully utilize off-peak power, the Taiwan Power Company (Taipower) had entrusted European consultants to undertake feasibility study since 1973. The study showed the feasibility of constructing Mingtan Dam to meet such peak load demand, to avoid expanding current fossil-fuel power plants in Taiwan and to have lower operational cost. The dam was completed in 1994 and opened a year later. During the 7.7-magnitude 1999 Jiji earthquake, Mingtan was one of eight dams that sustained damage, but did not collapse.

Mingtan Pumped Storage Hydro Power Plant
The Mingtan Pumped Storage Hydro Power Plant is the largest hydroelectric power plant in Taiwan. It uses Sun Moon Lake as the upper reservoir and Shuili River reservoir as lower reservoir. During high power demand, water used for power generation from Sun Moon Lake, as well as Shuili River, fills Mingtan Reservoir. During low demand, the water is pumped back upstream to the lake.

Transportation
The dam is accessible within walking distance North from Checheng Station of the Taiwan Railways Jiji Line.

See also

 Minghu Dam – located upstream with another pumped-storage power plant
 List of dams and reservoirs in Taiwan
 List of power stations in Taiwan
 List of pumped-storage hydroelectric power stations
 Electricity sector in Taiwan

References

1995 establishments in Taiwan
Dams completed in 1995
Dams in Nantou County
Pumped-storage hydroelectric power stations